Anthony Albertus Hermance "Thom" van Campen (born 18 January 1990) is a Dutch politician. He has been serving as a member of the House of Representatives on behalf of the conservative liberal People's Party for Freedom and Democracy (VVD) since the 2021 general election. Van Campen previously held a seat in the Zwolle municipal council (2011–2021) and served as a political assistant.

Early life, education, and career 
Van Campen was born in 1990 in Doetinchem, a city located in the Achterhoek, as the son of an education director and an entrepreneur, and he has an older and a younger sister. He attended the Doetinchem secondary school Ulenhofcollege at  level between 2002 and 2007. Van Campen studied journalism at the Windesheim University of Applied Sciences in Zwolle, graduating in 2012, and subsequently studied international relations (MSc) at the Vrije Universiteit Amsterdam. Back then, he also served as chief editor of the faculty magazine Essay.

He became an intern of MP Malik Azmani (VVD) in 2014 and served as personal assistant of MP Betty de Boer (VVD), whose specializations included railways, between May 2015 and December 2016. Thereafter, Van Campen started working as a strategic adviser at ProRail's public affairs department. He left ProRail in October 2017 to take a job as political adviser of Tamara van Ark, State Secretary for Social Affairs and Employment. Van Campen kept working for Van Ark when she became Minister for Medical Care in July 2020.

Politics 
Van Campen became a member of the VVD in 2008 and first appeared on the ballot, aged twenty, in the 2010 municipal elections as the VVD's seventh candidate in Zwolle. He was not elected, but the VVD did appoint him to the position . He succeeded VVD councilor René de Heer in March 2011, when he became an alderman, making Van Campen the youngest member of the Zwolle municipal council. He left his internship at the Nederlandse Omroep Stichting (NOS) in Brussels after one month because of his appointment. Van Campen's specialization in the council was culture policy.

He was re-elected in the 2014 municipal elections, in which he appeared fifth on the VVD's party list. In 2016, a proposal by Van Campen and a D66 councilor passed the municipal council for an experiment that allowed bars in Zwolle to be open the entire night. It eventually led to those rules becoming permanent in 2018. Van Campen became the VVD's caucus leader in August 2016 and was re-elected as his party's  – the youngest in the Zwolle VVD's history – in the 2018 municipal elections.

House of Representatives (2021–present) 
Van Campen ran for member of parliament in the 2021 general election, being placed sixteenth on the VVD's party list. He received 2,821 preference votes and was sworn in as House member on 31 March. Van Campen vacated his seat in the Zwolle municipal council the following month. In the House, he is the VVD's spokesperson for agriculture, food quality, the Food and Consumer Product Safety Authority (NVWA), and reactive nitrogen (formerly also health care prevention). Van Campen is on the parliamentary Committees for Agriculture, Nature and Food Quality; for Health, Welfare and Sport; and for Infrastructure and Water Management.

In the House, he proposed that same year to force the permanent closing of slaughterhouses after multiple violations of animal welfare regulations. As agricultural spokesperson, Van Campen was also involved in discussions about reactive nitrogen emissions, which the coalition consisting of the VVD had agreed to significantly reduce to improve the quality of nature reserves following a decision by the Council of State. During a party congress, members passed a motion with 51% of the vote to call on the VVD's House caucus to adjust cabinet plans to achieve these goals out of fear that they would harm the livability of rural areas. Van Campen had advised against the motion, disagreeing with its assumption that outdated techniques were being used to calculate emissions. In June 2022, counter-terrorism unit NCTV recommended Van Campen and several other members of parliament to stay away from a farmers' protest in Stroe due to safety concerns. Van Campen subsequently criticized House members who did attend, saying that a unified reaction from politicians to these threats would have been more comradely.

Van Campen serves as the VVD's vice caucus leader during the maternity leave of Bente Becker.

Personal life 
Van Campen lives in Zwolle and has a boyfriend.

References 

21st-century Dutch politicians
LGBT members of the Parliament of the Netherlands
Living people
Members of the House of Representatives (Netherlands)
Municipal councillors of Zwolle
People's Party for Freedom and Democracy politicians
Political staffers
Vrije Universiteit Amsterdam alumni
1990 births
Gay politicians
21st-century Dutch LGBT people
LGBT conservatism